The Victoria Travellers Football Club was a Canadian football that played in the British Columbia Rugby Football Union and the Western Canada Rugby Football Union from 1926 to 1933 Club.

The team was sponsored by the Order of United Commercial Travelers, a service organization known for its good works, which had recently expanded into Canada. The sponsorship ended in 1928 but the club continued on under another name.

The Victoria Travellers Football Club won the first BCRFU championship, their only one in 8 seasons.

Victoria Capitals 
The team was renamed Capitals in 1929, and lasted to 1933. A popular sports club, it fielded several other sports teams.

Victoria Revellers 
The final BCRFU team in Victoria was the Revellers, playing in 1939 and 1940 and winning the championship in the league's final season.

BCRFU season-by-season

Other Victoria, B.C. based team

References

Defunct Canadian football teams